Johan Wilhelm Broman (6 April 1877 in Vaasa – 2 June 1953) was a Finnish lawyer and politician. He was a member of the Parliament of Finland from 1927 to 1929, representing the Swedish People's Party of Finland (SFP).

References

1877 births
1953 deaths
People from Vaasa
People from Vaasa Province (Grand Duchy of Finland)
Finnish Lutherans
Swedish People's Party of Finland politicians
Members of the Parliament of Finland (1927–29)
University of Helsinki alumni